Associazione Sportiva Roma had a tremendous season in the league, scoring most goals and conceding the fewest goals of all teams, but despite this, A.C. Milan were able to run away with the title, due to a greater efficiency in winning their matches.

In Fabio Capello's last season as Roma's coach, the squad did not manage to win any titles whatsoever, even though the results showed a resurgence from the anticlimactic 2002–03 season, in which Roma dipped to eighth in the league standings.

Financial worries forced the club to sell Emerson to Juventus and Walter Samuel to Real Madrid following the season's end. Capello controversially signed for Juventus as well, but key players such as Francesco Totti, Antonio Cassano and Cristian Chivu remained.

Players

Squad information
Last updated on 16 May 2004
Appearances include league matches only

Transfers

Winter

Competitions

Overall

Last updated: 16 May 2004

Serie A

League table

Results summary

Results by round

Matches

Coppa Italia

Round of 16

Quarter-finals

UEFA Cup

First round

Second round

Third round

Fourth round

Statistics

Appearances and goals

|-
! colspan=14 style="background:#B21B1C; color:#FFD700; text-align:center"| Players transferred out during the season

Goalscorers

Last updated: 16 May 2004

Clean sheets

Last updated: 16 May 2004

Disciplinary record

Last updated:

References

A.S. Roma seasons
Roma